George W. King (c. 1880 – February 6, 1961) was an American football player and coach. He served as the head football coach at his alma mater, the College of the Holy Cross in Worcester, Massachusetts, in 1906, compiling a record of 4–3–1 King died at the age of 80, on February 6, 1961, at his home in Springfield, Massachusetts.

Head coaching record

References

Year of birth missing
1880s births
1961 deaths
Holy Cross Crusaders football coaches
Holy Cross Crusaders football players